The women's 60 kg (132 lbs) Light-Contact category at the W.A.K.O. World Championships 2007 in Belgrade was the second lightest of the female Light-Contact tournaments being the equivalent of the middleweight division when compared to the Low-Kick and K-1 weight classes.  There were thirteen women taking part in the competition, all based in Europe.  Each of the matches was three rounds of two minutes each and were fought under Light-Contact rules. 

Due to the number of fighters unsuited for a tournament designed for sixteen, three women had byes through to the quarter final stage.  The tournament gold medalist was Hungarian Klara Marton who defeated Ireland's Julie McHale in the final by unanimous decision.  Pole Monika Florek and Croatian Andrea Ivas claimed bronze medals.

Results

Key

See also
List of WAKO Amateur World Championships
List of WAKO Amateur European Championships
List of female kickboxers

References

External links
 WAKO World Association of Kickboxing Organizations Official Site

Kickboxing events at the WAKO World Championships 2007 Belgrade
2007 in kickboxing
Kickboxing in Serbia